HMS Hornet was a  torpedo boat destroyer of the British Royal Navy. She was launched in 1893 and sold in 1909 for scrapping. Although the  torpedo boat destroyers were ordered first, Havock and Hornet were completed faster, making them the first destroyers ever built.

Design and construction
In April 1892, the British Admiralty sent out a request to several shipbuilders for designs and tenders for "large sea going torpedo boats", or what later became known as "torpedo boat destroyers". In July 1892, it was decided to place an order with the two specialised torpedo-boat builders, Yarrows and Thornycroft for two ships each, with Yarrows' two ships named  and Hornet. While both Yarrow ships were powered by triple-expansion steam engines driving two shafts, they differed in the boilers used, with Havock using 2 conventional locomotive-type fire-tube boilers while Hornet used 8 Yarrow water tube boilers. (This resulted in Havock having 2 funnels while Hornet was fitted with 4 funnels). Gun armament consisted of a single 12 pounder gun, three 6 pounder (57 mm) guns, while torpedo armament consisted of three 18 in (450 mm) torpedo tubes, with one fixed bow tube and two deck mounted tubes, with the two deck-mounted tubes in a single rotating mounting, pointing in opposite directions, so that enemies on either beam could be attacked at the same time.

History
Hornet was laid down at Yarrow's Poplar, London yard on 1 July 1892. Hornets water tube boilers meant that it took longer to build than Havock, launching on 23 December 1893 and completed in July 1894.  The ship's performance during trials was generally successful, with only slight vibration noted and the ship steering well, and an average speed of  being made over a three-hour trial.

Hornet served almost all her service life in Home waters, although she did serve briefly in the Mediterranean in 1900. Hornets bow structure was strengthened in 1901. While the bow torpedo tube was found to be of little use, as it adversely affected seakeeping and restricted space forward, with fears that the ship could over-run a torpedo fired from the bow tube, Hornet retained the bow tube, while the two deck mounted tubes were removed by 1902. She took part in the Coronation Review for King Edward VII on 16 August 1902, with Lieutenant W. B. W. Grubb temporarily in command from 8 August. In late October 1902 she was at Sheerness dockyard for a refit.

Fate
A survey in February 1909 found that Hornets hull was in poor condition, with buckling of the hull plating and estimated repair costs of £4,050. She was sold on 12 October 1909 for scrapping.

Notes

Citations

References

External links 
A history of her class

 

Havock-class destroyers
Ships built in Cubitt Town
1893 ships